Ebuyer is an electronic commerce retailer based in Howden, East Riding of Yorkshire, England. It is the largest independent online retailer of computer and electrical goods in the United Kingdom.
The Ebuyer website is the 210th most visited site in the United Kingdom [Alexa.com ranking] and has 4 million registered customers.

History
Ebuyer was founded in March 2000 in Sheffield by Paul Cusack, Mike Naylor, Steve Kay, Neeraj Patel, and Adam Ashmore – with startup capital of £250,000 from Paul Cusack, its annual turnover was in excess of £220 million by September 2005.
Stuart Carlisle was its managing director (CEO) from 2014 until resigning in 2015.  Paul Cusack resigned in December 2006. Ebuyer (UK) Ltd turnover in the year to 31 December 2019 was £190.5m.

As of 2020, Ebuyer was owned by Malcolm Healey's West Retail Group.

Security
In July 2008, Gavin Brent, from Holywell in Flintshire, North Wales admitted stealing goods worth £20,000 from the firm before returning the goods, and demanding full refunds.
Brent, whose suspicious transactions were spotted by Ebuyer's security team, went on to conduct an online campaign against the company and the investigation. This included menacing Ebuyer staff and a police officer from Brent's now-defunct blog.

Barton Town F.C sponsorship 
Ebuyer is the official floodlight and short sponsor of Barton Town F.C. from Barton-upon-Humber.

Controversy
During 2005 Ebuyer had significant customer service problems. Sheffield Trading Standards received 282 complaints about the company, and the customer service phone number had been removed from its website. After this, the firm promised to improve its service, and restored the customer service number to its site. Average daily telephone wait times are published.

On 28 November 2011, eBuyer ran a £1 promotion via email, offering new deals on the hour until midnight. eBuyer angered customers when their website was unable to handle the extra traffic, causing it to crash. When the website did work, many customers were emailed after successfully ordering and paying for items, only to be told they were out of stock. Many customers vented their anger at the company on their Facebook page, however eBuyer ran a campaign on their customer forums in an attempt to counter the bad publicity.

In December 2013, eBuyer posted pictures to Facebook of its staff wearing Christmas themed jumpers. However, a Facebook user named Phil spotted that one of the images contained a leaderboard in the background that suggested that eBuyer staff were rated on the number of returns that they reject. eBuyer responded to these accusations by stating that these were return merchandise authorizations (RMAs) avoided by providing technical advice.

References

Retail companies established in 1999
Internet properties established in 1999
Online retailers of the United Kingdom
Companies based in the East Riding of Yorkshire
1999 establishments in the United Kingdom